Aminophenazone (or aminopyrine, amidopyrine, Pyramidon) is a non-narcotic analgesic substance. It is a pyrazolone and a derivative of phenazone, which also has anti-inflammatory and antipyretic properties. While inexpensive and effective, especially in the treatment of rheumatism, the drug carries a serious risk of severe and sometimes fatal side-effects, including agranulocytosis. While its production and use have been banned in many countries, including France, Thailand, India and Japan, it is still sometimes used in the developing world.

A breath test with 13C-labeled aminopyrine has been used as a non-invasive measure of cytochrome P-450 metabolic activity in liver-function tests. It is also used in measuring the total body water in the human body system.

History 
Aminophenazone was first synthesized by Friedrich Stolz and Ludwig Knorr in the late nineteenth century, and sold as an anti-fever medicine known as Pyramidon by Hoechst AG from 1897 until its eventual replacement by the safer propyphenazone molecule.

Symptoms 
Symptoms of exposure to this compound include:
 allergic reactions
 strong spasmolytic effect on smooth muscle of peripheral blood vessels
 irritability
 palsy
 copious sweating
 dilated pupils
 sharp drop then rise in body temperature 
 dysuria
 dyspnea
 anxiety
 rectal tenesmus
 urinary frequency
 intermittent fever
 fatty infiltration of the liver
 heart muscle degeneration 
 death due to circulatory failure following cardiovascular collapse
Agranulocytosis often occurs. Ingestion may cause central nervous system stimulation, vomiting, convulsions, cyanosis, tinnitus, leukopenia, kidney damage and coma. Ingestion may also lead to nausea, mental disturbances, methemoglobinemia, chocolate-colored blood, dizziness, epigastric pain, difficulty in hearing, thready pulse and liver damage.

Other symptoms reported via ingestion include hemolytic anemia, porphyria and severe gastrointestinal bleeding. Bone marrow depression also occurs. Rare eye effects include acute transient myopia.

Chronic symptoms include:
 anorexia
 edema
 oliguria
 urticaria
 hypersensitivity
 aplastic anemia
 sore throat
 fever
 pharyngeal membrane
 jaundice enlargement of the liver and spleen
 exfoliative dermatitis
 gastric or duodenal erosion with perforation or bleeding
 adrenal necrosis
 thrombocytopenic purpura 
 acute leukemia
When heated to decomposition this compound emits toxic fumes of nitrogen oxides.

Metabolism 
Amidopyrine is metabolized by demethylation and acetylation. Amidopirina metabolites are 4-aminoantipyrine, metilaminoantipirin, rubazonovaya and metilrubazonovaya acid. These acids have a reddish color. At high amidopirine doses, urine can have a reddish brown coloration, due to the presence in the urine of these acid markers.

References 

Pyrazolones
Analgesics
Antipyretics
Nonsteroidal anti-inflammatory drugs